WHMJ (99.3 FM) and WXMJ (104.5 FM) are Top 40 (CHR) music formatted radio stations broadcasting in northwest Pennsylvania, United States. The station is owned by Seven Mountains Media, and broadcasts from the Downtown Mall in Meadville.

History

Beginnings as WVEN-FM
This station debuted on 99.3 as WVEN-FM on March 5, 1971, as a partial simulcast of AM parent WFRA, with occasional break-aways for its own original programming that closely mirrored WFRA, usually during periods of the broadcast day when WFRA offered talk and news-intensive programming.  As more and more cars became equipped with FM radios, the two radio stations broke away from each other and became completely separate programming operations, though WVEN would recapture the call letters of its sister AM station in 1989.

For many years, WVEN was known as "Mix 99.3", boasting an Adult CHR format with full-service local elements.

WXMJ 104.5 made its debut on November 21, 1996 as WAQM.  This station was sold in July 2000 by MacBeth Communications to Forever Broadcasting.  Macbeth Communications was a company owned by Thom Sauber, the son of Robert H. Sauber, WFRA's founder.

Also in July 2000, Bob Sauber, whose son Tom managed WFRA-AM-FM in addition to his own WAQM, wanted to retire and put his stations up for sale.  All three (Sauber also owned WTIV in Titusville, the first of the group) were purchased by Altoona-based Forever Broadcasting, LLC for an undisclosed sum.  Sauber died in October 2004 at the age of 72.

The 2000s
After being acquired by Forever Broadcasting, the stations became "Today's Best Music: 99.3 and 104.5 The All-New Kiss FM" in November 2000. Kiss FM aired a Hot Adult Contemporary format from 5am-6pm, and a cross between CHR and Hot AC in the evening hours. In typical Forever Broadcasting fashion, it took many years for the "all new" imaging to be dropped. It finally was dropped in January 2006, only 21 months before the station would flip formats to the jockless "Majic."

The call letters used during the Kiss FM era were WOXX for the 99.3 signal and WXXO for the 104.5 signal.

99.3 and 104.5 KISS FM

Throughout its run as Kiss FM, the station was known in the community for the Kiss FM Sunday Night Dance Parties held in Conneaut Lake held during the summer months. With studios originally in Franklin, later moving to Meadville, the sense of community the station fostered was second to none. Weekly live broadcasts brought station personalities and community members together. The station had a very large staff of on air personalities with names such as "Ted Bear" (who was legendary Northwest Pennsylvania broadcaster Todd Adkins in disguise),"Billy Valentine","Drew Love" and "Cupid." All airshifts were live and local, and many radio personalities got their start at this once legendary station. Callers dedicated "Goodnight Kisses" each evening at 10pm, and overnight host "Jason Valentine" connected with many listeners with outrageous radio games and stunts. It was local small market radio at is absolute best, and was a textbook training ground for new talent. Program Director Todd Adkins took pride in his station and was always a caring man to his staff, encouraging them to grow and develop their on air talent. Mascot Tookie the Toucan greeted Northwest Pennsylvanians at numerous public and community events and appearances. The 24-hour live, local airstaff provided great local radio and content from 2000-2006. The final year and a half of the station brought the loss of 24/7 live disc jockeys, automation, and what would eventually be the beginning of the end of the golden era of Kiss FM. This coincided with the move of the studio from Franklin to Meadville, where it joined the other stations in the Forever cluster. General Manager Jim Shields did not see a need to staff the station as much, as he saw more money being spent on a staff who cared deeply for local radio an unnecessary burden. In late 2006, legendary Program Director Todd Adkins was let go after more than 20 years with the station, and the writing was then on the wall. Personalities such as Tyrel and Brett Hart took on air positions in a different market and were replaced by voicetracking and glitchy automation that rarely worked. From March 2006 to October 2007, the station went from a 24/7 live and local airstaff made up of 8 local on air personalities (including the then program director) and one off-air board operator to one off-air program director who had other duties within the company. A true sign of the sad state of corporate radio and a sad reminder of the once great station that Northwest Pennsylvanians no longer have in their community.

Special programming features during the Kiss FM tenure included the Top 9 at 9, Goodnight Kisses, the Kiss Cafe, Kiss Cartunes, Kiss It Or Diss It, and more recently the 5:00 Traffic Jam, 4 Play at 4, The Jammin' Saturday Night Kiss Party, and the Back In The Day Buffet. Hourly "Kiss In The Community" updates provided listeners with community event information and a chance for community members to have their message heard on local radio. All of these features made the station a local treasure and invaluable resource that is now gone from the Meadville, Franklin, and Oil City communities; replaced by a cheap automated radio station known as "Majic" that has eliminated jobs and does not offer listeners and community members the overall experience that Kiss FM did for many years.

Throughout its run as Kiss FM (and even dating back to the Mix 99.3 days) legendary countdown host Casey Kasem's shows were always carried on the station. Other syndication throughout Kiss FM's reign included Backtrax USA with Kid Kelly and Saturday Night 80's. Even with these syndicated shows airing on weekend mornings and evenings, the station still staffed young, upcoming radio talent to run the board. Now, all programming is done without a staff as the current "Majic" incarnation of the station.

Majic 99.3 and 104.5
At 5pm on October 10, 2007, the stations flipped to "Majic" 99.3 and 104.5". From 5pm on October 10 through 6am October 12, the station went jockless, airing Majic teaser sweepers but still playing the Kiss FM playlist. At 6am on Friday October 12, the station officially kicked off with a Variety Hits format. The last song heard as Kiss FM was "Makes Me Wonder" by Maroon 5. The first song of the new Majic format was "We're Not Gonna Take It" by Twisted Sister. The entire airstaff was let go or reassigned to other stations in the cluster. This move left Northwest Pennsylvania radio without an outlet for hit music for the first time since the 1970s.

In April 2012, Majic phased out the Variety Hits format, keeping the "Majic" moniker and jockless presentation, but re-adapting a 
Similar Hot AC/Adult Top 40 format that was found during the station's days as Kiss FM.

The Majic slogan debuted as "We Play Anything" but quickly switched to "We Play It All" due to nearby 94.7 Bob FM in Erie having the copyright for the former. With the April 2012 format tweak, the current slogan is "All The Hits", making WXBB the de facto adult hits station for Cambridge Springs and WRRK the de facto adult hits station for Franklin albeit far away. In 2016 the slogan changed back to "Today's Best Music", coming full circle from dropping exactly the same slogan during the 2007 Kiss FM to Majic format flip. As of January 2023, the slogan remains "Today's Best Music"

When the station was a Hot AC format as "Kiss FM" it boasted a large staff of live and local on air personalities. Until 2006, the station had a live personality in studio 24/7, even during the syndicated shows "American Top 40 with Casey Kasem" and "Saturday Night 80s." Voicetracking was occasionally used, but a live in studio board-op was always present. Now as Majic, the station is Top 40 and is automated 24/7 and the studio is unmanned. The station airs the syndicated Dave and Jimmy morning show out of WNCI Columbus.

Sale to Seven Mountains Media
It was announced on October 12, 2022 that Forever Media is selling 34 stations, including WHMJ, WXMJ, and the entire Meadville/Franklin cluster, to State College-based Seven Mountains Media for $17.3 million. The deal closed on January 2, 2023.

References

External links

Contemporary hit radio stations in the United States
HMJ
Radio stations established in 1971
1971 establishments in Pennsylvania